Tevhit Karakaya (born 1955, in Erzincan, Turkey) is a Turkish businessman and politician. He was elected MP in 1995 for the Welfare Party, in 1999 for its successor the Virtue Party, and in 2002 for the Justice and Development Party (AKP). He was a candidate for the AKP in 2007 but was not elected. In 2010 he acquired 50% of the Star Media Group.

References

1955 births
Welfare Party politicians
Virtue Party politicians
Justice and Development Party (Turkey) politicians
Turkish mass media owners
Deputies of Erzincan
People from Erzincan
Living people
Members of the 22nd Parliament of Turkey
Members of the 21st Parliament of Turkey
Members of the 20th Parliament of Turkey